The WeatherTech 240, also previously known as the Paul Revere 250, was a sports car race held on the road course at Daytona International Speedway on or around Independence Day, the same weekend of the NASCAR Cup Series' Firecracker 400. It has been held off-and-on over the history of that event, either the same night, or a couple days before. Traditionally, the race was held late at night, and finished in the early morning hours of the next day. The theme of the race was based on the famous "Midnight Ride" of Revolutionary War patriot Paul Revere.

From 1967 to 1968, the race was sanctioned by the SCCA. From 1969 to 1972, it was held as part of the NASCAR Grand American tour. Starting in 1973, it became part of the IMSA circuit, and continued through 1983. In some years, NASCAR drivers that raced in the Firecracker 400 in the morning, also took part in Paul Revere 250 that same night. In 1984, it switched to an SCCA Trans-Am event for one season. For 1985–1986, it was a motorcycle race, then it was discontinued.

In 2000, the event was revived by the Grand Am series. The tradition of starting late at night, however, was muted somewhat. The event was scheduled as a Thursday or Friday night event, held immediately following NASCAR pole qualifying and/or final practice. The start time would be roughly 10 p.m. eastern. Attendance for the weeknight races was very sparse. NASCAR's typical weeknight qualifying crowd is normally small, and most of those that were in attendance left as soon as qualifying was over. In 2009, the race was moved to Saturday afternoon as part of a Grand Am/NASCAR day-night doubleheader.

The race was removed from the schedule after 2010, and went on hiatus for a decade. In 2020, due to the COVID-19 pandemic, IMSA reorganized their schedule. They announced they would be resuming their season at Daytona with an evening race on July 4, marking the return of summer sportscar racing at Daytona. The race was named the WeatherTech 240, with a duration of 2 hours and 40 minutes, and was to be held in front of a limited number of spectators.

Past winners

 Run in twin 22-lap heats.
 1986 motorcycle event was scheduled for July 3, but was rained out and rescheduled for October.

Double Duty
In the earlier years of the event, a number of NASCAR drivers who participated in the Firecracker 400 also drove in the Paul Revere 250 in the same day or same weekend. In recent years, some drivers have also dabbled in the "double duty." In 2009, Scott Speed and Kyle Busch raced in both events in the same day, teaming up at Chip Ganassi Racing for the '250.'

References

External links
Grand-Am race page
Ultimate Racing History: Daytona archive
Racing Sports Cars: Daytona archive

Motorsport in Daytona Beach, Florida
IMSA GT Championship races
Grand-Am races
Recurring sporting events established in 1967
Recurring sporting events disestablished in 2009
1967 establishments in Florida
2009 disestablishments in Florida